So Kwang-chol (born 23 January 1987) is a North Korean footballer. He represented North Korea on at least seven occasions between 2007 and 2008.

Career statistics

International

References

1987 births
Living people
Sportspeople from Pyongyang
North Korean footballers
North Korea international footballers
Association football midfielders
Amnokgang Sports Club players